Adli or Adly is both a surname and a given name. Notable people with the name include:

Surname:
 Adam Adli, Malaysian student activist
Ahmed Adly (born 1987), Egyptian chess player
Amine Adli (born 2000), French footballer
Amirul Adli (born 1996), Singaporean footballer
Habib Ibrahim El Adly (born 1938), Egyptian politician
Joseph El Adli (born 1988), American paleontologist
Mohamed Adly (born 1987), Egyptian basketball player
Yacine Adli (born 2000), French footballer

Given name:
 Adli El Shafei (1919–), Egyptian tennis player
Adli El Shafei II (born 1973), Egyptian tennis player
Adli Lachheb (born 1987), Tunisian footballer
Adli Qudsi (1940–2018), Syrian architect
Adli Yakan Pasha (1864–1933), Egyptian politician
Adly Kasseb (1918–1978), Egyptian actor
Adly Mansour (born 1945), Egyptian judge and politician
 Adly Yaish, Palestinian mayor 
 Adly Zahari (born 1971), Malaysian politician
Al-Adli ar-Rumi, Arab Shatranj player

Arabic-language surnames
Arabic masculine given names